Chan Shen (11 March 1940 - 26 April 1984) was a Taiwanese-born Hong Kong film actor. He is best known for his roles as gangsters or villains in Hong Kong action cinema in the 1970s.

Already an established film actor in Taiwan, he entered the Hong Kong film industry in 1971. He was a particularly prolific actor and would often appear in as many as ten films a year. In his fourteen-year film career in Hong Kong, he appeared in 160 action films.

Much of his career was spent at Hong Kong's Shaw Studio.

Filmography
Shi wan qing nian shi wan jun(1967) - Japanese Soldier
The Swift Knight (1971) - brothel owner 
The Golden Seal (1971) - Wu Tian Ting 
The Oath of Death (1971) - doubles Ma in death scene 
The Golden Lion (1971) - Brother Eight 
Long Road to Freedom (1971)     
Six Assassins (1971) - Yu Li-De 
The Rescue (1971) - Chief 
The Lady Professional (1971) - Shi Yun Pu 
King Boxer (1972) - Wan Hung-Chieh 
The Fugitive (1972) - Lau Lo Sham 
The Deadly Knives (1972) - Ishikawa 
Intimate Confessions of a Chinese Courtesan (1972) - Master Li Zhang An 
The Devil's Mirror (1972) - Chief Bai's bodyguard 
The Young Avenger (1972) - Mad Monk 
The Gourd Fairy (1972)     
Stranger in Hong Kong (1972) - Ting Ta-Chuan 
The Imperial Swordsman (1972) - giant 
The Fourteen Amazons (1972) - Hsia soldier w. signal arrow 
The Bamboo House of Dolls (1973) - Japanese shoots US pilot 
Call to Arms (1973) - Prince of Wei 
Payment in Blood (1973)     
The Master of Kung Fu (1973) - Mai Gen 
The Kiss of Death (1973) - Atom 
Ambush (1973) - Han Chung 
The Villains (1973)     
Facets of Love (1973) - Brothel client 
Heroes of Sung (1973) - Zongba  
The Bastard (1973) - Ji Wen Tai 
The House of 72 Tenants (1973) - Brother Shum 
The Happiest Moment (1973) - Rickshaw puller 
Sex, Love and Hate (1974) - thug after Jun 
The Golden Lotus (1974) - killer 
Gossip Street (1974) - Godfather's thug 
Hong Kong 73 (1974) - Policeman 
Sinful Confession (1974) - Juan's husband 
The Rat Catcher (1974) - gangster 
Sorrow of the Gentry (1974) - Captain Wang 
The Tea House (1974) - Shen Fan Ming (cameo) 
Dracula and the 7 Golden Vampires (1974) - Kah, villainous monk 
Rivals of Kung Fu (1974) - Ah Kwun 
The Shadow Boxer (1974) - Yuan 
Village of Tigers (1974)     
Night of the Devil's Bride (1975)     
All Mixed Up (1975)     
Evil Seducers (1975)     
Forbidden Tales of Two Cities (1975) - Wang 
The Imposter (1975) - Bandit searched by Liang 
The Big Holdup (1975) - Qing, cop 
The Spiritual Boxer (1975) - Master Lin 
The Bloody Escape (1975) - Junshi 
Bloody Money (1975) - Chief Constable 
Cleopatra Jones and the Casino of Gold (1975) - Soo Da Chen 
The Protectors (1975) - Kasha (Thousand Hands Buddha) 
Cuties Parade (1975)     
Lady of the Law (1975) - Officer Yan Bixian 
Lover's Destiny (1975) - Ding, Zhang's Adjutant 
The Magic Blade (1976) - Kung Sun Tao 
Emperor Chien Lung (1976) - Priest 
Crazy Sex (1976) - One of Big Boss Men 
King Gambler (1976) - Mr Li (Shi's sidekick) 
The Web of Death (1976) - Venom clan section chief 
The Criminals (1976) - 3) 
The Condemned (1976) - Mr Liang 
Killer Clans (1976) - Roc Society member 
The Drug Connection (1976) - Long Tou 
Brotherhood (1976) - Fan Nan 
Wedding Nights (1976)     
Love Swindler (1976) - 2) David 
The Last Tempest (1976) - palace guard 
Homicides - The Criminals, Part II (1976) - 3: Fa 
The Sentimental Swordsman (1977) - junior monk 
He Has Nothing But Kung Fu (1977)     
The Brave Archer (1977) - Ling Tze 
The Mad Monk (1977) - Qian Ru-Ming 
Death Duel (1977) - Leader of Hei Sha Clan 
The Adventures of Emperor Chien Lung (1977) - officer collecting tax 
Moods of Love (1977) - Lao San 
Pursuit of Vengeance (1977) - Gong Sun-Duan 
The Call Girls (1977) - Japanese tourist 
Clans of Intrigue (1977) - Boss at Inn 
The Dream of the Red Chamber (1977) - priest 
Assault - The Criminals, Part IV (1977) - 2) Cai 
Judgement of an Assassin (1977) - 7th Branch Chief Yian Chun 
Dreams of Eroticism (1977) - Jia Zhen 
To Kill a Jaguar (1977) - Tin Pa 
Jade Tiger (1977) - Liu 
The 36th Chamber of Shaolin (1978) - Abbot in charge of Wrist Chamber 
Invincible Shaolin (1978) - Master Mai Qi, South Shaolin 
Heaven Sword and Dragon Sabre (1978) - Kwan Lun School Chief Ho 
The Brave Archer 2 (1978) - Spiritual Wisdom 
The Voyage of Emperor Chien Lung (1978) - Zhang's brothers teacher 
Swordsman And Enchantress (1978) - zombie fighter 
Shaolin Hand Lock (1978) - Fang Yu Biao 
The Proud Youth (1978) - Priest Zhishan 
The Mad Monk Strikes Again (1978) - Master Sun Jia Zhu 
Hello Sexy Late Homecomers (1978)     
The Psychopath (1978)     
Heaven Sword and Dragon Sabre, Part II (1978) - Kwun Lun School Chief Ho 
Clan of Amazons (1978) - Lu Wenhu 
Soul of the Sword (1978) - swordsman 
Legend of the Bat (1978) - Auctioner 
The Daredevils (1979) - Chief of Staff Xu 
Funny Children (1979)     
The Kung-Fu Instructor (1979) - Fake Brother 
Heaven and Hell (1979)     
Abbot of Shaolin (1979) - Dan Tian-Gang 
Shaolin Rescuers (1979) - Zhou Cheng 
The Proud Twins (1979) - Chief of 10 Villains 
The Last Judgement (1979)     
Invincible Enforcer (1979) - Ho Yin Wong 
The Deadly Breaking Sword (1979) - Fan Fei, custodial officer 
The Brothers (1979) - Boss Huang Shou Ren 
Full Moon Scimitar (1979) - Robber with coffin 
Return of the Dead (1979) - Da-Yan 
Rendezvous with Death (1980) - Chi Sifang 
The Flag of Iron (1980) - Eagle Hall Chief Mi Jiu Gao 
Hex Versus Witchcraft (1980) - Brother Nine 
Haunted Tales (1980) - Ah Cheng 
A Deadly Secret (1980) - Monk Bo Cheung 
Swift Sword (1980) - Leng Ruyun 
Lost Souls (1980) - Hok 
The Kid with a Tattoo (1980) - man in wheelchair 
The Tiger and the Widow (1980) - Dong Jin Piao 
Young Outcasts (1980)     
Every Man for Himself (1980)     
Emperor Chien Lung and the Beauty (1980) - Wan Tzu Mu 
Bat Without Wings (1980) - Ghost King 
Revenge of the Corpse (1981)     
Gambler's Delight (1981) - Madam Jin's thug 
The Battle for the Republic of China (1981)     
What Price Honesty? (1981) - prison chief 
The Imp (1981) - Old Uncle Han 
Notorious Eight (1981) - Hu's man 
Challenge of the Gamesters (1981) - Huang Jiang 
Sword Stained with Royal Blood (1981) - Master Rong (Lung Yau Sch's chief) 
Bloody Parrot (1981) - Master San 
The Emperor and His Brother (1981) - Ching henchman 
Tiger Killer (1982) - Master Zhang 
The 82 Tenants (1982) - Sgt Chiang 
Passing Flickers (1982) - Fa Hai 
The Brave Archer and His Mate (1982) - Senior Teacher Or 
Coolie Killer (1982)     
Five Element Ninjas (1982) - Chief Hong 
My Rebellious Son (1982) - one of Tang's men 
The Emperor and the Minister (1982) - Boss Han 
Godfather from Canton (1982) - Secret Service Officer 
Ode to Gallantry (1982) - Bai 
Fast Fingers (1983) - Adulterer 
Shaolin and Wu Tang (1983) - Shaolin Abbot 
Shaolin Prince (1983) - Abbot of Shaolin Temple 
Holy Flame of the Martial World (1983) - Shaolin Clan Leader 
Usurpers of Emperor's Power (1983) - Advisor Zhao Pu 
Shaolin Intruders (1983) - Head Abbot 
Bastard Swordsman (1983) - Guardian of the Law 
Take Care, Your Majesty (1983) - brothel patron 
Lust from Love of a Chinese Courtesan (1984) - Officer Fu 
Wits of the Brats (1984) - Shih Chun 
Pale Passion (1984) - Uncle Liu 
Return of the Bastard Swordsman (1984) - Chi Song 
Opium and the Kung-Fu Master (1984) - Mr Lu 
Crazy Shaolin Disciples (1985) - His Highness 
Disciples of the 36th Chamber (1985) - School Officer Sha Duo'er 
Pursuit of a Killer (1985) - Uncle Zhi

External links

Biography at www.hkcinemagic.com

Hong Kong male film actors
Taiwanese male film actors
1940 births
1984 deaths
Male actors from Taichung
20th-century Hong Kong male actors
20th-century Taiwanese male actors
Taiwanese emigrants to Hong Kong